The Montiggler Seen are two lakes in the municipality of Eppan in South Tyrol, Italy.

External links

References 
Environment agency of South Tyrol 

Lakes of South Tyrol